The Barack Obama "Joker" poster is a heavily manipulated and doctored image of former United States President Barack Obama, designed by Firas Alkhateeb in January 2009, that was adopted by some critics of the Obama administration and described as the most famous anti-Obama image.  The image portrays Obama as comic book supervillain Joker, based on the portrayal by Heath Ledger in The Dark Knight (2008).  Alkhateeb has said the image was not intended to make a political statement.  He uploaded the image to the photo-sharing website Flickr, from where it was downloaded by an unknown individual who added the caption "socialism".

Described by The Guardian as the "American right's first successful use of street art", since April 2009, the poster was frequently used by anti-Obama protesters.

Origin
The first known use of Obama's image being "Jokerified" was published on Myspace by a user listed as Ross Brummet in August 2008.  The image was of a smiling Barack Obama, his face painted over with Joker-style makeup, and the quote "The U.S. deserves a better class of war criminal, and I'm going to give it to them." A second instance, and the first to receive media coverage,  occurred at a rally for vice presidential candidate Joe Biden at Florida State University on November 2, 2008. Two members of the FSU College Republicans created the poster from an Obama "Hope" poster they had purchased from the school's College Democrats club, and used it to demonstrate outside the Biden event. This design featured the caption "Why So Socialist?", a parody of The Dark Knights "Why So Serious" tagline. The students dismissed criticism of the poster, explaining that it was simply a pop culture reference designed to "get the attention of a college audience".

The version of the image that was eventually popularized was created by Alkhateeb, a 20-year-old Palestinian American history student at the University of Illinois at Chicago. He digitally manipulated the Obama photograph from the October 2006 Time magazine cover, using Adobe Photoshop. His version did not contain the "socialism" label. Alkhateeb was influenced by artist Shepard Fairey, designer of the Obama "Hope" poster, and wanted to practice a "Jokerize" technique he learned in class.  He digitally added the Joker face paint over the Obama image and uploaded it to Flickr on January 18, 2009.  Alkhateeb is said to have had no ill-will towards Obama, but was simply bored.

Reaction

Media coverage

The image went largely unnoticed until an unknown person began placing posters of the image, with the added label "socialism," throughout downtown Los Angeles, California.  In April 2009, Bedlam magazine became the first media outlet to report on Obama "Joker" signs being spotted in Los Angeles. During the summer months, Obama "Joker" posters were distributed in Florida and Atlanta, Georgia. In August 2009, the posters became a viral phenomenon online. The poster quickly became the center of an international "media typhoon" widely covered by news outlets such as CNN, Fox News, and the Drudge Report.

Media coverage ranged from praise for the image's artistic value to critics labeling the poster racist.  Culture critic Philip Kennicott of The Washington Post described the poster as a "subtly coded, highly effective racial and political argument".  Thomas Lifson, editor of The American Thinker, described it as "open mockery of Barack Obama, as disillusionment sets in with the man", and The First Post suggested the image marked "a turning of the tide of public opinion against a president who promised so much".  Film critic Peter Bradshaw of The Guardian described the poster as "the single most chilling—and brilliant—piece of poisonous political propaganda I think I have ever seen."

Copyright and free speech controversy

The media coverage resulted in Flickr removing all copies of the image, citing a Digital Millennium Copyright Act (DMCA) takedown notice, and deleting forum threads discussing the image.  The takedown was met with much backlash from the Flickr community and caused Flickr to change their DMCA takedown policy.  The new policy provides for a page to remain if a takedown notice is filed against it, but for the image to be replaced with one that reads: "This image has been removed due to a claim of copyright infringement."  A spokesperson for the Electronic Frontier Foundation, a digital rights advocacy group, defended Alkhateeb's image citing fair use protection.  As a result of Flickr removing the Obama "Joker" image, some online communities viewed Alkhateeb as the most visible representative, in August 2009, of free speech on the Internet.

Protest symbol
The image was adopted by some of Obama's critics and used for posters, T-shirts, bumper stickers, and other merchandise. The image is considered by some a symbol of the Tea Party protest movement. During the September 12, 2009, Taxpayer March on Washington, the largest demonstration against the Obama Administration's policies to date, protesters denouncing deficit spending and the America's Affordable Health Choices Act of 2009, dubbed "Obamacare" by critics, carried Obama "Joker" signs captioned .

Criticism
Some Democrats have called the image racist, suggesting a similarity to blackface makeup that was used during minstrel show performances.  Earl Ofari Hutchinson, president of the Los Angeles Urban Policy Roundtable, said, "Depicting the president as demonic and a socialist goes beyond political spoofery. It is mean-spirited and dangerous. We have issued a public challenge to the person or group that put up the poster to come forth and publicly tell why they have used this offensive depiction to ridicule President Obama."

Ray Tampa, president of the National Association for the Advancement of Colored People (NAACP) chapter in St. Petersburg, Florida, had a differing opinion: "I see it as the Joker, and being that I see it as the Joker I will have to say that it's fair game".

Alkhateeb, in response to the usage of his image, said, "To accuse [Obama] of being a socialist is really ... immature. First of all, who said being a socialist is evil?"  He also stated "socialism is an idea thats time has come and passed. It’s basically like calling someone a loyalist to the British crown".

See also
 
 The New Yorker § 2008 Obama cover satire and controversy

References

External links
 Firas Alkhateeb video interview by WLS-TV

2009 works
Cultural depictions of Barack Obama
Internet censorship in the United States
Political Internet memes
Internet memes introduced in 2009
Political art
Public art
Joker (character)
Works based on DC Comics
Portraits of politicians
Works about socialism
Conservative media in the United States
Street art